Lützow-Lübstorf is an Amt in the district of Nordwestmecklenburg, in Mecklenburg-Vorpommern, Germany. The seat of the Amt is in Lützow.

The Amt Lützow-Lübstorf consists of the following municipalities:

Ämter in Mecklenburg-Western Pomerania